William Plant may refer to:
 William Plant (racewalker) (1892 – 1969), American racewalker that competed in the 1920 Summer Olympics
 William J. Plant (1847 – 1905), Irish-American politician in New York
 William Plant (sailor) (1944 – 2018), Jamaican sailor that competed in the 1968 Olympics

See also
Bill Plante (William Madden Plante, 1938-2022), American journalist